Pond Island Light is a lighthouse at the mouth of the Kennebec River, Maine. It was first established in 1821 on Pond Island (one of several in Maine) at the mouth of the Kennebec. The present structure was built in 1855.

References

Lighthouses completed in 1855
Lighthouses in Sagadahoc County, Maine
1821 establishments in Maine